Manitou Rapids 11 is a First Nations reserve in northwestern Ontario, near Chapple. It is one of two reserves of the Rainy River First Nations.

References

Saulteaux reserves in Ontario
Communities in Rainy River District